Indian Creek is a village in Miami-Dade County, Florida, United States. It has 41 residential home sites and the Indian Creek Country Club. The population was 84 at the 2020 census.

Geography
Indian Creek is located in northeastern Miami-Dade County at  (25.879156, –80.131130). It occupies an island bordered by Biscayne Bay to the west, Indian Creek to the south and east, and Indian Creek Lake to the north. Neighboring communities are Bay Harbor Islands to the north, Surfside to the east, Miami Beach to the south, and North Miami to the west, across Biscayne Bay. Automobile access is via a bridge from Surfside.

Demographics

As of 2010, there were 33 households, out of which 21.2% were vacant. In 2000, 14.3% had children under the age of 18 living with them, 50.0% were married couples living together, 28.6% had a female householder with no husband present, and 14.3% were non-families. 14.3% of all households were made up of individuals, and none had someone living alone who was 65 years of age or older. The average household size was 2.36 and the average family size was 2.33.

In 2000, the village population was spread out, with 18.2% under the age of 18, 3.0% from 18 to 24, 30.3% from 25 to 44, 30.3% from 45 to 64, and 18.2% who were 65 years of age or older. The median age was 44 years. For every 100 females, there were 94.1 males. For every 100 females age 18 and over, there were 68.8 males.

In 2000, the median income for a household in the village was $61,250, and the median income for a family was $61,250. Males had a median income of $46,875 versus $24,375 for females. The per capita income for the village was $137,382. There were 21.4% of families and 29.4% of the population living below the poverty line.

As of 2013, English was the mother tongue for 40.00% of the population, while other Indo-European languages were spoken by 32.70% of all residents. Speakers of Spanish accounted for 27.30%, while the combined total of those who spoke an Asian language or Pacific Islander language made up 0.00%. The rest of the people who spoke any other languages in Indian Creek were at 0.00%. In total, 60.00% of the populace spoke something other than English as their first language.

Politics
In the 2016 presidential election, Indian Creek went to Donald Trump with 20 votes (56%) while Hillary Clinton received 16 votes (44%). In the 2020 presidential election, Indian Creek tallied 42 votes (79%) for Donald Trump and 11 votes (21%) for Joe Biden.

Photos 
 Photo of Indian Creek Village as it appeared in Forbes magazine

Education
Residents are assigned to Miami-Dade County Public Schools.

Ruth K. Broad/Bay Harbor K–8 Center in Bay Harbor Islands serves as the local elementary and K–8 school. Residents who want to have a conventional middle school may instead choose the zoned middle school, Miami Beach Nautilus Middle School. Miami Beach Senior High School is the senior high school serving Surfside.

Notable people
 Tom Brady, Tampa Bay Buccaneers quarterback
 Norman Braman, former Philadelphia Eagles owner and billionaire art collector
 Gisele Bündchen, Brazilian model
 Carl Icahn, billionaire investor
 Julio Iglesias, Spanish singer
 Jared Kushner and Ivanka Trump
 Edward Lampert, hedge fund billionaire and Sears CEO
 Adriana Lima, model

Other notable residents both past and present have included:
 Arthur I. Appleton, president of Appleton Electric Company and founder of the Appleton Museum of Art and Bridlewood Farm, and his wife Martha O'Driscoll, a former Hollywood actress
 Don Shula, longtime Miami Dolphins head coach
 George Smathers, U.S. senator

References

External links
 Indian Creek Public Safety Department 
 Florida U.S. Department of Commerce Census

Villages in Miami-Dade County, Florida
Villages in Florida
Populated places on the Intracoastal Waterway in Florida